St. Jones Without was a community located on the western side of Trinity Bay in Newfoundland and Labrador. It was first settled around 1870. By 1891 the community had two schools and two churches (Methodist and Church of England). The population peaked at 140 in 1935. During World War II many of the residents relocated to find work and the community was abandoned in the early 1950s.

See also
List of communities in Newfoundland and Labrador
List of ghost towns in Newfoundland and Labrador

References 
 Smallwood, Joseph R. Encyclopedia of Newfoundland and Labrador, Newfoundland Book Publishers Ltd., 1967, p. 544
 

Ghost towns in Newfoundland and Labrador